The 1907 New York Giants season was the franchise's 25th season. The team finished in fourth place in the National League with an 82–71 record, 25½ games behind the Chicago Cubs.

Regular season

Season standings

Record vs. opponents

Roster

Player stats

Batting

Starters by position 
Note: Pos = Position; G = Games played; AB = At bats; H = Hits; Avg. = Batting average; HR = Home runs; RBI = Runs batted in

Other batters 
Note: G = Games played; AB = At bats; H = Hits; Avg. = Batting average; HR = Home runs; RBI = Runs batted in

Pitching

Starting pitchers 
Note: G = Games pitched; IP = Innings pitched; W = Wins; L = Losses; ERA = Earned run average; SO = Strikeouts

Other pitchers 
Note: G = Games pitched; IP = Innings pitched; W = Wins; L = Losses; ERA = Earned run average; SO = Strikeouts

Relief pitchers 
Note: G = Games pitched; W = Wins; L = Losses; SV = Saves; ERA = Earned run average; SO = Strikeouts

Awards and honors

League top five finishers 
 Red Ames: #3 strikeouts (146)
 Art Devlin: #5 stolen bases (38)
 Christy Mathewson: #1 wins (24)
 Christy Mathewson: #1 strikeouts (178)
 Christy Mathewson: #1 shutouts (8)
 Spike Shannon: #1 runs scored (104)
 Sammy Strang: #4 on-base percentage (.388)

External links
1907 New York Giants season at Baseball Reference

New York Giants (NL)
San Francisco Giants seasons
New York Giants season
New York G
1900s in Manhattan
Washington Heights, Manhattan